is a railway station on the Aoimori Railway Line in the town of Nanbu in Aomori Prefecture, Japan, operated by the third sector railway operator Aoimori Railway Company.

Lines
Kenyoshi Station is served by the Aoimori Railway Line, and is 14.8 kilometers from the terminus of the line at Metoki Station. It is 632.1 kilometers from Tokyo Station.

Station layout
Kenyoshi Station has two ground-level opposed side platforms serving two tracks connected to the station building by a footbridge. The station is staffed.

Platforms

History
Kenyoshi Station was opened on July 1, 1897, as a station of the Nippon Railway. When the Nippon Railway was nationalized on November 1, 1906, it became a station on the Tōhoku Main Line of the Japanese Government Railways (JGR) and later the Japanese National Railways (JNR). Freight operations were discontinued from November 1982. The station has been managed from Hachinohe Station since February 1983. With the privatization of the JNR on April 1, 1987, it came under the operational control of JR East. The station came under the control of the Aoimori Railway Line on December 1, 2002.

Surrounding area

Mabechi River
Aomori Bank Kenyoshi branch
Nagawa Post office
Nanbu town office Kenyoshi branch

See also
 List of Railway Stations in Japan

External links
 

Railway stations in Aomori Prefecture
Aoimori Railway Line
Railway stations in Japan opened in 1897
Nanbu, Aomori